This is the overview of Odense Boldklub's matches in European football.

2004–05 Intertoto Cup
Intertoto Cup
 First Round

Odense won 7–0 on aggregate.

 Second Round

Villarreal won 5–0 on aggregate.

2006–07 Intertoto Cup and UEFA Cup
Intertoto Cup
 Second Round

Odense won 3–1 on aggregate.

 Third Round

Odense won 2–2 on aggregate and away goal.

 UEFA Cup
 Second qualification round

Odense won 6–1 on aggregate.

 First round

Odense won 3–2 on aggregate.

 Group Stage
Group D

2007–08 UEFA Cup

 First qualification round

Odense won 5–0 on aggregate.

 Second qualification round

Odense won 5–1 on aggregate.

 First round

Sparta Prague won 4–3 after penalty shootout.

2008–09 UEFA Intertoto Cup

 Second Round

Odense won 4–1 on aggregate.

 Third Round

Aston Villa won 3–2 on aggregate.

2009–10 UEFA Europa League
 Third qualification round

Odense won 7–3 on aggregate.

 Playoff round

Genoa won 4–2 on aggregate.

2010–11 UEFA Europa League
 Third qualification round

Odense won 5–3 on aggregate.

 Play-off

Odense won 3–1 on aggregate.

 Group stage

2011–12 UEFA Champions League

 Third qualification round

Odense won 5–4 on aggregate.

 Play-off round

Villarreal won 3–1 on aggregate.

2011–12 UEFA Europa League
 Group stage
Group K

Odense Boldklub